Nguyễn Thanh Huyền (born 12 August 1996) is a Vietnamese footballer who plays as a defender for Women's Championship club Hà Nội I and the Vietnam women's national team.

References

External links

1996 births
Living people
Women's association football defenders
Vietnamese women's footballers
Vietnam women's international footballers
Footballers at the 2018 Asian Games
Asian Games competitors for Vietnam
21st-century Vietnamese women